This article shows all participating team squads at the 2013 FIVB Women's Club World Championship squads, held from October 9 to 13, 2013 in Zurich, Switzerland.

Pool A

Guangdong Evergrande
Head Coach:  Lang Ping

Kenya Prisons
Head Coach:  David Lungaho

Voléro Zürich
Head Coach:  Jan De Brandt

Pool B

Iowa Ice
Head Coach:  Janelle Hester

Unilever Vôlei
Head Coach:  Bernardo Rezende

Vakıfbank Istanbul
Head Coach:  Giovanni Guidetti

References 

C
2013 in volleyball